Reading Transport may refer to:

Reading Buses, bus operator in England that traded as Reading Transport until 1991
Reading Company, former railroad in Pennsylvania
Transport in Reading, Berkshire